Foreign relations exist between Bahrain and Malaysia. Bahrain has an embassy in Kuala Lumpur, and Malaysia has an embassy in Manama. Malaysia also are the strong supporters to the Bahrain national dialogue during the 2011 civil unrest and willing to send a peacekeeping forces to help the country.

Economic relations 
Trade relations between the two countries are currently increasing. Bahrain has invited Malaysia's business community to invest in the country. Thus, many Malaysian firms has already represented in Bahrain and been involved in major projects including the building of the Bahrain International Circuit, Bahrain City Centre and many other infrastructure projects, such as the expansion of the Sitra Causeway. Between January–October 2007, the bilateral trade between the two countries stood at U$191 million and around 7,200 Bahraini has visit Malaysia in the same year. Currently, Bahrain also in the process to become a business destination. Both countries also competes in the sector of Islamic banking.

Further reading 
 Crown Prince arrives in Malaysia and conducts meeting with the Malaysian Prime Minister Bahrain News Agency
 The Official Visit of YB Datuk Anifah Hj Aman, Minister of Foreign Affairs of Malaysia to the Kingdom Of Bahrain, 30 June to 2 July 2009 Ministry of Foreign Affairs, Malaysia
 SPEECH AT THE BUSINESS FORUM MALAYSIA-BAHRAIN BUSINESS OPPORTUNITIES Malaysia Prime Minister Office

See also
Foreign relations of Bahrain 
Foreign relations of Malaysia

References 

 
Malaysia
Bilateral relations of Malaysia